Khunu Leima (/khoo-noo lei-ma) or Khunureima (/khoo-noo-rei-ma) is the goddess of pigeons and doves in Meitei mythology and religion. She is a sister of goddesses Nganu Leima and Shapi Leima. Legend says that all three sisters married the same mortal man.

Etymology 
The Meitei female given name "Khunu Leima" (ꯈꯨꯅꯨ ꯂꯩꯃ) is made up of two component words, "Khunu" (ꯈꯨꯅꯨ) and "Leima" (ꯂꯩꯃ). In Meitei, "Khunu" (ꯈꯨꯅꯨ) means pigeon. The word "Leima" (ꯂꯩꯃ) is further made up of two component words, "Lei" (ꯂꯩ) and "Ma" (ꯃ). "Lei" (ꯂꯩ) means land or earth. "Ma" (ꯃ) means "mother". Literally, "Leima" (ꯂꯩꯃ) can be translated as "Land Mother" or "Mother Earth". But in general context, "Leima" (ꯂꯩꯃ) means a queen or a mistress or a lady.

Description 
Khunu Leima is described as the ruler of all pigeons. At any time, she could summon all pigeons to any place she wishes. She is one of the daughters of the sky god Salailen (Soraren).

See also 
 Ngaleima, Meitei goddess of fish

References

Bibliography 
 Glimpses of Manipuri Culture - Dr. Yumlembam Gopi Devi
 The History of Manipur: An early period - Wahengbam Ibohal Singh · 1986

External links 

 

Abundance deities
Abundance goddesses
Animal deities
Animal goddesses
Arts deities
Arts goddesses
Beauty deities
Beauty goddesses
Dance deities
Dance goddesses
Fertility deities
Fertility goddesses
Fortune deities
Fortune goddesses
Leima
Love and lust deities
Love and lust goddesses
Magic deities
Magic goddesses
Maintenance deities
Maintenance goddesses
Marriage deities
Marriage goddesses
Meitei deities
Music and singing deities
Music and singing goddesses
Names of God in Sanamahism
Nature deities
Nature goddesses
Pastoral deities
Pastoral goddesses
Peace deities
Peace goddesses
Savior deities
Savior goddesses
Time and fate deities
Time and fate goddesses
Trickster deities
Trickster goddesses